Lorenz Assignon (born 22 June 2000) is a French professional footballer who plays as a defender for  club Rennes.

Career 
On 3 March 2020, Assignon signed his first professional contract with Rennes. During the second half of the 2020–21 season, he was loaned to third-tier Bastia, where he helped the club win the Championnat National, contributing one goal in thirteen appearances.

Assignon made his professional debut for Rennes as a substitute in a 3–1 UEFA Europa Conference League win over Rosenborg on 26 August 2021. On 8 September 2022, he scored his first professional goal for Rennes, a last-minute winner in a 2–1 UEFA Europa League victory over AEK Larnaca. Sports newspaper L'Équipe described his goal as "Zlatanesque".

Personal life
Assignon is the son of Togolese former footballer Komlan Assignon.

Honours 
Bastia

 Championnat National: 2020–21

References

External links

Stade rennais profile

2000 births
Living people
People from Grasse
Sportspeople from Alpes-Maritimes
French sportspeople of Togolese descent
French footballers
Footballers from Provence-Alpes-Côte d'Azur
Association football defenders
Ligue 1 players
Championnat National players
Championnat National 3 players
Stade Rennais F.C. players